Breakfast Club or The Breakfast Club may refer to:

 The Breakfast Club, a 1985 American film
 The Breakfast Club (radio show), an American radio show
 Don McNeill's Breakfast Club, an American radio show 1933–1968
 Breakfast Club (band), an American music group
 Breakfast Club (British politics), a 2015 group
 School breakfast club, a provision for children to eat a healthy breakfast in a safe environment before their first class

See also